Angelo Davoli (12 November 1896 - 13 February 1978) was an Italian middle-distance runner who competed at the 1924 Summer Olympics.

National titles
He won eight times the national championships at senior level.

Italian Athletics Championships
1500 metres: 1927
5000 metres: 1924, 1926
3000 metres steeplechase: 1928, 1930
Cross country: 1923, 1924, 1926

References

External links
 

1896 births
1978 deaths
Sportspeople from Genoa
Athletes (track and field) at the 1924 Summer Olympics
Italian male cross country runners
Italian male middle-distance runners
Olympic athletes of Italy